The Paraguayan Episcopal Conference (Spanish: Conferencia Episcopal Paraguaya, CEP) is an agency of the Catholic Church which gathers the bishops of Paraguay.

History

Since 1929 some bishops of the country are beginning to exercise a collegial teaching by issuing joint pastoral letters and decrees, and agree to meet regularly since 1955. The following year he founded the Episcopal Conference in Paraguay, which then becomes Venerable Episcopado Paraguayo, and finally assumed its present name in 1960.

Members and bodies

They are part of the PEC archbishops and bishops (owners, retired, brothers) of the Catholic Church in Paraguay, including the ordinary soldier.

List of presidents
 1958–1970: Juan José Aníbal Mena Porta
 1970–1973: Pastor Ramon Bogarín Argana
 1973–1985: Felipe Santiago Benítez Avalos
 1985–1989: Ismael Blas Rolón Silvero
 1989–1990: Felipe Santiago Benítez Avalos
 1990–1994: Jorge Adolfo Carlos Livieres Banks
 1994–1999: Oscar Páez Garcete
 1999–2002: Jorge Adolfo Carlos Livieres Banks
 2002–2005: Claudio Giménez Medina
 2005–2009: Ignacio Gogorza Izaguirre
 2009–2011: Pastor Cuquejo
 2011–2015: Claudio Giménez Medina
 2015–2018: Edmundo Valenzuela

External links
 http://www.episcopal.org.py/

Paraguay
Catholic Church in Paraguay